The Fulton County Courthouse, originally the Tryon County Courthouse, and for a time the Montgomery County Courthouse, is a historic courthouse building located on North William Street at the corner of West Main Street in Johnstown, Fulton County, New York. It was built in 1772 to 1773 and is a Late Georgian style public building.  It is the oldest existing Court House in the State of New York and one of the oldest in the United States still being used as a Court House.

The courthouse is a -story brick structure, five bays wide and three bays deep.  It features a bellcast gable roof with a cupola dating to the late 18th or early 19th century. Sir William Johnson, 1st Baronet (1715–1774) contributed £500 toward the construction of the building.

It was listed on the National Register of Historic Places in 1972.

References

External links

Fulton County Court House, The Historical Society of the Courts of the State of New York

Government buildings completed in 1773
Courthouses on the National Register of Historic Places in New York (state)
Historic American Buildings Survey in New York (state)
County courthouses in New York (state)
Georgian architecture in New York (state)
Buildings and structures in Fulton County, New York
National Register of Historic Places in Fulton County, New York